Tayfun Türkmen  (born 12 April 1978) is a Turkish former football player.

Although he could also play as a central defender, Tayfun was renowned primarily as a centre forward.

References

External links
 Profile at TFF.org.tr

1978 births
Living people
People from Anamur
Association football forwards
Association football defenders
Turkish footballers
Ankaraspor footballers
Konyaspor footballers
Kayseri Erciyesspor footballers
Hacettepe S.K. footballers
MKE Ankaragücü footballers
Eskişehirspor footballers